"Ecce homo" (Latin: "Behold the Man"), is a phrase traditionally attributed to Pontius Pilate at the trial of Jesus.

Ecce Homo may also refer to:

Art
Ecce Homo (Antonello da Messina) (1470–1475), a 1475 series of paintings by Antonello da Messina
Ecce Homo (Bosch, 1470s), a 1470s painting by Hieronymus Bosch
Ecce Homo (Bosch, 1490s), a 1490s painting by Hieronymus Bosch or a follower
Ecce homo (Mantegna), a  painting by Andrea Mantegna
Ecce Homo (Titian), or Christ Carrying the Cross, a 1505 oil painting attributed to either Titian or Giorgione
Ecce Homo (Correggio), or Christ Presented to the People, a  painting by Antonio da Correggio
Ecce Homo (Titian, Vienna), a 1543 painting by Titian
Ecce Homo (statue), a  statue by an unknown artist
Ecce Homo (Caravaggio), a  painting by Caravaggio
Christ Presented to the People, or Ecce Homo, a  drypoint print by Rembrandt
Ecce Homo (Daumier), an 1850 painting by Honoré Daumier
Ecce Homo (Juan Luna), an 1896 painting by Juan Luna
Ecce homo (Martínez and Giménez, Borja), a  fresco by Elías García Martínez known for its failed restoration attempt
Ecce Homo (exhibition), a 1998–2004 controversial photo exhibition

Literature
Ecce Homo! Or, A Critical Inquiry into the History of Jesus Christ; Being a Rational Analysis of the Gospels, a book by Baron d'Holbach
Idou o anthropos or Ecce Homo, an 1886 book by Andreas Laskaratos
Ecce Homo (book), an autobiography by Friedrich Nietzsche, written in 1888 and published in 1908
"Ecce homo", an essay by John Robert Seeley

Music
Ecce Homo (Grant Hart album), 1994
Ecce Homo (The Hidden Cameras album), 2001
"Ecce homo", a song by Serge Gainsbourg from Mauvaises Nouvelles des Étoiles
"Ecce homo", a song by Titus Andronicus from Local Business
"Ecce Homo", the theme tune from Mr. Bean
"Ecce Homo", a composition for cord orchestra, music by Jacques Charpentier, 2 dancer ballet by Joseph Lazzini

Other uses
Ecce Homo (church), a church on Via Dolorosa in the Old City of Jerusalem

See also 
ECCE (disambiguation)
 Homo (disambiguation)